Michael Ian Krauss (born April 21, 1951) is a professor emeritus of law at Antonin Scalia Law School (previously George Mason University School of Law), specializing in tort law, products liability, jurisprudence and legal ethics. He writes a Torts and Legal Ethics column for Forbes.

Biography 
Krauss was born in New York City and raised in Canada. He holds a B.A. from Carleton University. He received an LL.B. from l'Université de Sherbrooke, graduated first in his class, and earned the highest grade point average in the history of that law school. Krauss also holds an LL.M. from Yale Law School.  He was hired as clerk to the Hon. Louis-Philippe Pigeon of Canada's Supreme Court. Krauss went on to practice corporate law in Québec City, and in 1983, completed his doctoral residency as Columbia University's Law and Economics Fellow. He has taught at law schools in French Canada, English Canada, the United States, France, Israel, and Guatemala.

In 1994, Krauss was awarded George Mason University's Teacher of the Year award, and he remains the only George Mason Law School Professor to receive the university-wide award.

Krauss was elected to the American Law Institute in 2008 and is a member of the Board of Governors of the National Association of Scholars. He has served as a member of the Legal Education Task Force of the Virginia State Bar since 2011 and was a member of the Maryland State Advisory Committee to the United States Commission for Civil Rights from 2011 to 2013. He has also served as a Commissioner for Québec's Human Rights Commission.

From 2011 to 2012, Krauss was Of Counsel to the Clearspire Law Firm.

Krauss was faculty advisor to George Mason's Federalist Society chapter, and lectures frequently at Federalist Society chapters across the country. Krauss endorsed Donald Trump for president in the 2020 presidential campaign.

In 2020, Krauss achieved emeritus status at the Antonin Scalia Law School. 

Krauss resides in Six Mile, South Carolina with his wife, Cynthia Conner, Consulting Managing Editor and past Vice President of the American Health Lawyers Association.

Publications 
He has published widely in law reviews, magazines and newspapers; and he has written three books:

 Fire & Smoke: Government, Lawsuits, and the Rule of Law,
Principles of Products Liability
Legal Ethics in a Nutshell  (co-authored).

References

External links 
 Antonin Scalia Law School biography

1951 births
American legal scholars
Federalist Society members
Yale Law School alumni
20th-century American Jews
Living people
George Mason University faculty
National Association of Scholars
21st-century American Jews